Copelatus schaefferi is a species of diving beetle. It is part of the subfamily Copelatinae in the family Dytiscidae. It was described by Young in 1942.

References

schaefferi
Beetles described in 1942